Newmarket, Virginia may refer to:

 New Market, Virginia
 Newmarket, Newport News, Virginia, a neighborhood of Newport News